Betta ideii is a species of gourami. It is a freshwater fish native to Asia, where it is known only from South Kalimantan on the island of Borneo in Indonesia. The species reaches 8.3 cm (3.3 inches) in standard length and is known to be a facultative air-breather. Its specific name, ideii, honors the fish collector Takashige Idei.

References 

Species described in 2006
Osphronemidae
Freshwater fish of South Asia
Fish of Indonesia
Taxa named by Heok Hui Tan